Bowel cleansing or bowel preparation is a medical technique to cleanse bowel to prepare colonoscopy or colorectal surgery. Cleansing can be performed either by the oral ingestion of medication or by enema.  Polyethylene glycol and citrates are used for bowel cleansing.

See also
 Enema
 Vaginoplasty

References

Drugs acting on the gastrointestinal system and metabolism
Large intestine